Brendon Lade (born 10 July 1976) is a former Australian rules footballer with the Port Adelaide Football Club in the Australian Football League (AFL). He is currently a senior assistant coach with the Western Bulldogs Football Club.

AFL career

Early career (1992–1999) 
Lade was born on Kangaroo Island and grew up playing football for the local Western Districts Football Club, where his father coached the A grade side. At the age of 8 Lade moved to the Wisanger Football Club, where he played the remainder of his football until he turned 16. Able to play as both a relieving ruckman and forward, Lade played for South Australian National Football League club South Adelaide before his recruitment to Port Adelaide in the lead up to their inaugural season in the AFL in 1997. Lade made his senior AFL debut for Port Adelaide in Round 1, 1997, Port Adelaide's debut AFL match.

Injury (2000–2001) 
Lade missed just one game in his first three years, before he suffered a serious leg injury in Round 2 of 2000 which sidelined him for the rest of the season and also caused him to miss the entire 2001 AFL season after a re-injury. However, he recovered from these injuries to become one of the best ruckmen in the league.

Career high (2004–2009) 

In 2004 Lade had a great year, leading the club's hitouts statistics in the absence of injured Port Adelaide ruckman Matthew Primus, finishing second in the goalkicking to Warren Tredrea, and capping it off with a premiership medal when Port Adelaide won its first AFL premiership, defeating the Brisbane Lions. In 2006 Lade won All-Australian selection and also took out the John Cahill Medal, Port Adelaide's Best and Fairest. In 2007 Lade continued his career-best form, winning another All-Australia selection, and earning a rare 2 year contract with the Power at 31 years old.

Lade retired at the end of the  2009 season. He and team-mate Peter Burgoyne, the last remaining members of Port Adelaide's inaugural AFL team, both played their final games in Round 22, 2009.

Coaching career (2010–present) 
After ending his 234-game AFL career in 2009, Lade immediately joined Richmond Football Club to become the ruck coach, joining former Port Adelaide teammate Damien Hardwick, Richmond's senior coach. He later became the midfield stoppage coach, and held this position until the end of 2016, after which he returned to Port Adelaide as an assistant coach for the 2017 AFL season. At the end of the 2018 season, Lade returned to Melbourne to become the senior assistant coach for St Kilda Football Club after two seasons as an assistant with Port Adelaide. During the 2022 season, Lade temporarily stepped into the senior coaching chair with St Kilda senior coach Brett Ratten missing due to COVID, leading the Saints to a win over Gold Coast in Round 5. 
At the end of the 2022 season, Lade joined the Western Bulldogs as an assistant coach.

Statistics

|- style="background-color: #EAEAEA"
! scope="row" style="text-align:center" | 1997
|
| 20 || 22 || 14 || 12 || 156 || 76 || 232 || 98 || 16 || 171 || 0.6 || 0.5 || 7.1 || 3.5 || 10.5 || 4.5 || 0.7 || 7.8
|-
! scope="row" style="text-align:center" | 1998
|
| 20 || 22 || 20 || 14 || 182 || 97 || 279 || 115 || 28 || 239 || 0.9 || 0.6 || 8.3 || 4.4 || 12.7 || 5.2 || 1.3 || 10.9
|- style="background-color: #EAEAEA"
! scope="row" style="text-align:center" | 1999
|
| 20 || 21 || 10 || 8 || 167 || 93 || 260 || 100 || 11 || 325 || 0.5 || 0.4 || 8.0 || 4.4 || 12.4 || 4.8 || 0.5 || 15.5
|-
! scope="row" style="text-align:center" | 2000
|
| 20 || 2 || 0 || 1 || 3 || 3 || 6 || 3 || 0 || 11 || 0.0 || 0.5 || 1.5 || 1.5 || 3.0 || 1.5 || 0.0 || 5.5
|- style="background-color: #EAEAEA"
! scope="row" style="text-align:center" | 2001
|
| 20 || 0 || — || — || — || — || — || — || — || — || — || — || — || — || — || — || — || —
|-
! scope="row" style="text-align:center" | 2002
|
| 5 || 14 || 12 || 6 || 57 || 25 || 82 || 33 || 8 || 139 || 0.9 || 0.4 || 4.1 || 1.8 || 5.9 || 2.4 || 0.6 || 9.9
|- style="background-color: #EAEAEA"
! scope="row" style="text-align:center" | 2003
|
| 5 || 19 || 12 || 4 || 129 || 77 || 206 || 90 || 25 || 272 || 0.6 || 0.2 || 6.8 || 4.1 || 10.8 || 4.7 || 1.3 || 14.3
|-
! scope="row" style="text-align:center" | 2004
|
| 5 || 24 || 31 || 10 || 156 || 120 || 276 || 110 || 41 || 382 || 1.3 || 0.4 || 6.5 || 5.0 || 11.5 || 4.6 || 1.7 || 15.9
|- style="background-color: #EAEAEA"
! scope="row" style="text-align:center" | 2005
|
| 5 || 24 || 24 || 15 || 160 || 98 || 258 || 112 || 27 || 306 || 1.0 || 0.6 || 6.7 || 4.1 || 10.8 || 4.7 || 1.1 || 12.8
|-
! scope="row" style="text-align:center" | 2006
|
| 5 || 22 || 18 || 12 || 253 || 102 || 355 || 187 || 32 || 436 || 0.8 || 0.5 || 11.5 || 4.6 || 16.1 || 8.5 || 1.5 || 19.8
|- style="background-color: #EAEAEA"
! scope="row" style="text-align:center" | 2007
|
| 5 || 25 || 15 || 5 || 207 || 102 || 309 || 131 || 37 || 517 || 0.6 || 0.2 || 8.3 || 4.1 || 12.4 || 5.2 || 1.5 || 20.7
|-
! scope="row" style="text-align:center" | 2008
|
| 5 || 17 || 10 || 12 || 121 || 73 || 194 || 91 || 25 || 349 || 0.6 || 0.7 || 7.1 || 4.3 || 11.4 || 5.4 || 1.5 || 20.5
|- style="background-color: #EAEAEA"
! scope="row" style="text-align:center" | 2009
|
| 5 || 22 || 16 || 7 || 142 || 70 || 212 || 97 || 24 || 395 || 0.7 || 0.3 || 6.5 || 3.2 || 9.6 || 4.4 || 1.1 || 18.0
|- class="sortbottom"
! colspan=3| Career
! 234
! 182
! 106
! 1733
! 936
! 2669
! 1167
! 274
! 3542
! 0.8
! 0.5
! 7.4
! 4.0
! 11.4
! 5.0
! 1.2
! 15.1
|}

References

External links

1976 births
Living people
All-Australians (AFL)
Australian rules footballers from South Australia
Port Adelaide Football Club players
Port Adelaide Football Club Premiership players
Port Adelaide Football Club players (all competitions)
John Cahill Medal winners
South Adelaide Football Club players
People from Kangaroo Island, South Australia
One-time VFL/AFL Premiership players